is the eleventh single by Do As Infinity, released in 2001.

This song was included in the band's compilation albums Do the Best and Do the A-side.

Track listing
 
 "Remember the Hill"
  (Instrumental)
 "Remember the Hill" (Instrumental)

Chart positions

External links
 "Bōkenshatachi" at Avex Network
 "Bōkenshatachi" at Oricon

2001 singles
Do As Infinity songs
Songs written by Dai Nagao
Song recordings produced by Seiji Kameda
2001 songs
Avex Trax singles